This is a list of lakes in Guatemala.

Lakes

References 

Lakes
Guatemala